Nordenfalk is Swedish surname. Notable people with the surname include: 

Johan Nordenfalk (1796–1846), Swedish politician and Prime Minister for Justice
Carl Nordenfalk (1907–1992), Swedish art historian

Swedish-language surnames